The Tampa and Gulf Coast Railroad (T&G) was a railroad company in the Tampa Bay Area of Florida in the United States. It initially built and operated a line that ran from the Tampa Northern Railroad main line in Lutz (just north of Tampa) west to Tarpon Springs and into Pasco County.  Additional track starting from Sulphur Springs running west towards Clearwater and south to St. Petersburg was built shortly after. The railroad was informally known as the "Tug n' Grunt".  While it was the second railroad to serve St. Petersburg and Clearwater after the Orange Belt Railway, it had the advantage of being the first to connect the area directly with Tampa.

History

Construction and early years
The Tampa and Gulf Coast Railroad was incorporated in 1909.  In 1910, it acquired a logging railroad operated by the Gulf Pine Company that ran from Lutz, where it connected to the main line of the Tampa Northern Railroad, west to Gulf Pine via Lake Fern.  The T&G then extended this line west to Tarpon Springs, where it terminated less than a block away from the Orange Belt Railway, which by then was owned by the Atlantic Coast Line Railroad (ACL).  The extension connected with another line from Lake Villa north to Elfers and New Port Richey, which the T&G bought from J.M. Weeks and Company in 1912.

In 1914, a second line was built south of the first line from Sulphur Springs, also on the Tampa Northern Railroad main line, west through what is now Oldsmar, across Tampa Bay, and through Safety Harbor to Clearwater.  Just south of Clearwater in Belleair, the line crossed the ACL's track and headed south.  A branch to Indian Rocks Beach was also built, which was abandoned in the 1940s.  From Belleair, the line ran south to the southeast part of the Pinellas Peninsula near Seminole.  It then crossed Long Bayou and south to South Pasadena before turning east to St. Petersburg.  The T&G built a passenger depot in St. Petersburg at Ninth Street and Second Avenue.  During this time, a branch line was also built to connect the two T&G lines from Rocky Creek (then known as Tarpon Junction) on the line leading to Clearwater to Lake Fern on the line leading to Tarpon Springs, which allowed the T&G to abandon the segment of the original line between Lake Fern and Lutz.

Acquisition by the Seaboard Air Line

The Tampa and Gulf Coast Railroad only briefly operated as an independent company.  In 1915, it was bought out by the Seaboard Air Line Railroad (SAL), who bought the Tampa Northern Railroad two years prior. The SAL continued to operate the T&G as a separate rail line until it was fully integrated with the SAL network in 1927.  The Seaboard Air Line would designte the line as part of their Tampa Subdivision (which also included track from Sulphur Springs to Gary and the Seaboard main line between Tampa Union Station and Coleman).  The branches to Tarpon Springs and Elfers were designated as the Tarpon Springs Subdivision and Elfers Subdivision respectively.  The Seaboard Air Line would extend a number of their long-distance passenger trains from Tampa to St. Petersburg along the route including the Orange Blossom Special, the Southern States Special, the Florida Sunbeam, and the New York-Florida Limited.

Later years

Seaboard would go on to merge with the Atlantic Coast Line Railroad (ACL) in 1967, who still operated their own rail line in the area.  The resulting company after the merger was the Seaboard Coast Line Railroad (SCL), who connected the two Pinellas County routes where they crossed near Belleair.  The T&G became the westernmost segment of the company's Yeoman Subdivision.  After the merger, passenger service was provided by the Silver Star and the Champion (which was replaced by the Silver Meteor in 1979).  Though, passenger service would be rerouted to the ex-ACL line in Belleair since all passenger traffic consolidated at the ACL's St. Petersburg station.  The T&G from Belleair south was then used for local freight only.  Passenger trains were taken over by Amtrak in 1971 and were discontinued between Tampa and St. Petersburg in 1984.

In 1980, the Seaboard Coast Line's parent company merged with the Chessie System, creating the CSX Corporation.  The CSX Corporation initially operated the Chessie and Seaboard Systems separately until 1986, when they were merged into CSX Transportation.  In 1983, the company sold the original Tampa and Gulf Coast Railroad right of way from Belleair to 34th Street South in St. Petersburg to the Florida Department of Transportation.  This segment is now part of the Pinellas Trail (which also continues north from Belleair along the former Orange Belt/Atlantic Coast Line route).  Track east of 34th Street South in St. Petersburg (which connected to the ex-ACL line near Tropicana Field) remained in service as the South Side Spur until the mid-2000s, when it was also removed and became part of the Pinellas Trail.

CSX continues to operate the remaining tracks of the Tampa and Gulf Coast Railroad, which is now part of their Clearwater Subdivision.  The Upper Tampa Bay Trail runs along some of the former right of way of the Tarpon Springs Branch.

Historic stations

See also

Seaboard Coast Line Railroad station (St. Petersburg, Florida)

References

1909 establishments in Florida
Defunct Florida railroads
Seaboard Air Line Railroad
Predecessors of the Seaboard Air Line Railroad
Railway companies established in 1909
Railway companies disestablished in 1927